Kevin Cahoon (born July 21, 1971) is an American actor, director, writer, and singer-songwriter.

Early life
Kevin Cahoon was born on July 21, 1971, in Houston, Texas. Cahoon began his performing career at the age of six as 'The World's Youngest Rodeo Clown', performing throughout the Texas and Oklahoma Rodeo Circuits, including many consecutive seasons at the Houston Livestock Show and Rodeo and the Texas State High School Finals Rodeo, resulting in a Letter of Citation from then Texas Governor Bill Clements.

At 10, Cahoon began his acting career in Houston, performing at local theaters including Theatre Under the Stars, Stages, The Main Street Theatre, and The Houston Grand Opera. Notable productions included the Anthony Newley/Leslie Bricusse musical Chaplin, Mame opposite Marilyn Maye, and the controversial production of Christopher Durang's Sister Mary Ignatius Explains It All For You at the then Tower Theatre.

Cahoon apprenticed with Theatre Under The Stars' Humphrey's School of Musical Theatre, appeared in numerous commercials, and performed at the opening ceremonies of Houston's Wortham Center for the Performing Arts.

He is featured in the book Theatre Under the Stars: Stars In Your Eyes.

At 13, Cahoon won the Teen Male Vocalist Grand Championship on television's Star Search, and went on to tour that summer in The Stars of Star Search.

He majored in acting at Houston's High School for the Performing and Visual Arts. He then went on to receive a BFA from New York University's Tisch School of the Arts at Circle in the Square.

Career

Theatre

After graduation, Cahoon made his Broadway debut in The Who's Tommy. On Broadway he played Ed the Hyena in The Lion King directed by Julie Taymor, George in The Wedding Singer, The Childcatcher in Chitty Chitty Bang Bang, and was in the revival of The Rocky Horror Show.

He left his role in The Lion King to perform the eighth show of the week for John Cameron Mitchell in the title role of Hedwig in Hedwig and the Angry Inch at The Jane Street Theater Off-Broadway, eventually taking over the role and starring as 'Hedwig' in Boston, the Edinburgh Festival in Scotland, and an extended eight-month run at The Victoria Theatre in San Francisco. He was also featured in the documentary film Whether You Like It Or Not: The True Story of Hedwig. Cahoon recently joined creators John Cameron Mitchell and Stephen Trask on 'The Origin of Love Tour' at Town Hall in NYC.

Off-Broadway, Cahoon played Phil D'Armano in Andrew Lippa's The Wild Party at the Manhattan Theatre Club. He also starred opposite Matthew Broderick in the Roundabout Theatre Company's revival of The Foreigner for which he received a Lucille Lortel Award nomination for Outstanding Featured Actor. Other off-Broadway credits include The Shaggs: Philosophy of the World at Playwrights Horizons and the revival of Paula Vogel's How I Learned to Drive at Second Stage. For New York's City Center Encores! Series, he was seen as Woof in Hair and Peter in Babes in Arms.

Cahoon recently portrayed the role of Trinculo in Barry Edelstein's production of The Tempest with The LA Philharmonic at The Walt Disney Concert Hall. He has performed regionally at The Berkshire Theatre Festival, NY Stage and Film, The Guthrie Theatre, The Muny, The Bucks County Playhouse, and The Williamstown Theatre Festival. Other regional theater credits include Kathleen Marshall's production of Love's Labors Lost for which he received a San Diego Theatre Critics Circle Nomination for Best Featured Actor in a play and he portrayed the Sheriff of Nottingham in Ken Ludwig's Robin Hood!, both at The Old Globe. He originated the role of Hans Christian Andersen in the American premiere of Stephen Schwartz's My Fairytale for California's PCPA and appeared in The Imaginary Invalid at Bard Summerscape alongside Peter Dinklage, in Minsky's at L.A.'s Ahmanson Theatre, and in the all-male production of A Funny Thing Happened on the Way to the Forum directed by Jessica Stone. Cahoon originated the role of Jr.Jr. in Moonshine: That Hee Haw Musical at the Dallas Theater Center written by Robert Horn, Shane McAnally, and Brandy Clark.

Cahooon is featured in the Original Cast Recordings of The Lion King, The Rocky Horror Show, The Wild Party, Babes In Arms, The Wedding Singer, and The Shaggs: Philosophy Of The World.

He also appeared on the 1998, 2000, and 2006 Tony Awards.

Television and film

On television, Cahoon will portray Earl Clark on FOX's 'Monarch', beginning September 2022. Other television credits include, Hugo on Season 2 and Season 3 of A Series of Unfortunate Events (Netflix), Rueben Lundgren on Nurse Jackie (Showtime), Jon-Jon on Modern Family (ABC), Ross Rothman on Six Degrees (ABC) and Kermit Jones on The Royale (AMC). He has also guest starred on Elementary (CBS), Odd Mom Out (BRAVO), Black Box (ABC), The Good Wife (CBS), The Mentalist (CBS), CSI (CBS), Franklin and Bash (TNT), NCIS (CBS), Canterbury's Law (FOX), Hope and Faith (ABC), Ed (NBC), Law and Order (NBC) and Law and Order: Criminal Intent (NBC). On film he can be seen in '''So Cold The River''',I Am Michael, Disney's Mars Needs Moms, Woody Allen's The Curse of the Jade Scorpion, Paul Reiser's The Thing About My Folks, Adrienne Shelly's Sudden Manhattan, Michael Knowle's One Night, and W.E. directed by Madonna. He also was featured in the Woody Allen short, Sounds From A Town I Love, which was created for VH-1's "The Concert for NYC" after September 11, 2001. He portrayed Bobby Barnes on Season 3 of Glow on Netflix.

Directing

Cahoon directed the critically acclaimed virtual and live productions of Terrence McNally's 'It's Only A Play', as well as Larry Shue's The Nerd both for The George Street Playhouse. He directed the 2017 New York Theatre Workshop Gala starring Jesse Tyler Ferguson, Rachel Dratch, Ben Platt, Patti LuPone, and Christine Ebersole, among others. He returned to direct NYTW's 2018 gala starring Zachary Quinto and Celia Keenan-Bolger, the 2020 gala starring Ana Gastayer and Taylor Mac, its virtual 2021 gala starring Annaleigh Ashford, Bridgett Everett, and Michael Urie, as well as its 2022 gala honoring Jim Nicola. Cahoon directed the developmental productions Toe Pick: The Complete Ice Capades of Nancy Kerrigan and Tonya Harding starring Zackary Grady and John Early, Grifftopia starring and created by Griffin Newman and the debut productions of Tastiskank, created by Kate Reinders and Sarah Litzsinger, which went on to win the Aspen Comedy Festival, all for the Ars Nova Theatre in NYC. He directed six consecutive productions for the Bay Area Houston Ballet and Theatre. For his work at BAHBT, he received the Jete Society Honor in 2011.

Music

With his New York-based band Kevin Cahoon and Ghetto Cowboy, Cahoon has played shows at New York venues including CBGB's, Don Hill's, Ars Nova, Joe's Pub, and Irving Plaza. He has shared the bill with Tom Waits, Elvis Costello, and Justin Bond. He is also featured in the documentary film Squeezebox about NYC's downtown music scene. Cahoon and Ghetto Cowboy's debut album, Doll, received The Out Music Award for Outstanding Debut Recording, received a Citation of Merit from Billboard Magazine's World Songwriters Awards, received the Pabst Blue Ribbon Live & Local Award for New York City, and the feature film Ready? OK! used the title song for its lead track. Cahoon and Ghetto Cowboy are presenters on Sirius Radio's OutQ, charting in the top 10, and on LOGO's NewNowNext.

Kevin has been profiled by The New York Times, Paper Magazine, and TimeOut NY, and is featured in Amy Arbus's photography collection 'The Fourth Wall', Julie Taymor's 'The Lion King: Pride Rock On Broadway' as well as, Michael Reidel's 'Singular Sensation - The Triumph of Broadway'.

Filmography

Film
 1993:  - Long Island Teen #3
 2011: Mars Needs Moms - Wingnut (voice)
 2022: So Cold the River - Dylan

Television
 2015: Modern Family - John-John Episode: "Fight or Flight"
 2018-2019: A Series of Unfortunate Events - Hugo
 2019: Glow - Bobby Barnes
 2022: Monarch - Earl Clark

Videogames
 2006: Bully - Thad
 2018: Red Dead Redemption 2 - Clay Davies
 2019: Red Dead Online - Clay Davies

References

External links

1971 births
Living people
American singer-songwriters
American male singer-songwriters
20th-century American male actors
21st-century American male actors
American male video game actors
Circle in the Square Theatre School alumni
Tisch School of the Arts alumni
Male actors from Houston
Rodeo clowns
High School for the Performing and Visual Arts alumni
21st-century American singers
People from Houston